Local elections were held in Tunisia on 6 May 2018 under the supervision of the Independent High Authority for Elections. These were Tunisia's first free and democratic local elections following the Tunisian Revolution and saw unaffiliated independent lists win the most votes but on a very low turnout especially in terms of youth turnout which was down sharply.

References

Tunisia
Local
Tunisia
Local elections in Tunisia